Jorge Mário da Silva, more commonly known by his stage name Seu Jorge (Seu, an abbreviation of "Senhor"; born June 8, 1970), is a Brazilian musical artist, songwriter, and actor.  He is considered by many a renewer of Brazilian pop samba. Seu Jorge cites samba schools and American soul singer Stevie Wonder as major musical influences.  Jorge is also known for his film roles as Mané Galinha in the 2002 film City of God and as Pelé dos Santos in the 2004 film The Life Aquatic with Steve Zissou. His musical work has received praise from many of his fellow musicians including Beck and David Bowie.

Biography 
The first-born of four children (the others being Charles, Vitório and Rogério), Seu Jorge had a tough childhood in the neighborhood of Gogó da Ema, in Belford Roxo. He started working in a tire shop when he was only 10 years old, the first of various jobs such as courier, joiner, and potato peeler in a bar. Seu Jorge served in the Brazilian Army from 1989 to 1990 in Rio de Janeiro, but did not adapt to the military lifestyle and ended up being expelled, in January of 1990.

The various professions never hindered Seu Jorge's dream of becoming a musician. Since his adolescence, he would frequent samba circles and funk parties with his dad and brothers, and early on started to perform singing at such events. It was there that, in 1990, the murder of his brother Vitório tore his family apart, and Seu Jorge ended up being homeless for around three years. The turnaround happened when Gabriel Moura, nephew of clarinetist Paulo Moura, invited him to participate in a spectacle called The flour saga (known in Portuguese as A saga da farinha), in which Gabriel was the musical director. He ended up participating in more than 20 shows with the Companhia de Teatro TUERJ, as singer and actor. Since he had no place to sleep, Seu Jorge slept in the theater, between 1993 and 1997 – the year where he joined the band Farofa Carioca.

Career
Seu Jorge has gained exposure through his work as an actor and soundtrack composer. He appeared in the critically acclaimed 2002 film City of God as Mané Galinha, directed by filmmakers Fernando Meirelles and Katia Lund, and then played Pelé dos Santos in Wes Anderson's The Life Aquatic with Steve Zissou, for which he provided much of the soundtrack in the form of Portuguese language cover versions of David Bowie classics.

In June 2006, he performed at Bonnaroo music festival in Manchester, Tennessee and at the Festival Sudoeste TMN in Portugal. He also performed at the Harbourfront in Toronto, Ontario. Jorge's performances are known for their excitement as well as for getting the crowd moving.  In January 2010 he performed with Thievery Corporation at Austin City Limits.

His album 'América Brasil' had a limited Brazilian release in 2007 under his label Cafuné Gravadora, distributed in the UK by Proper Music Distribution. In May 2010, Now-Again Records announced that Jorge's new album, Seu Jorge & Almaz, a collaboration with drummer Pupillo and guitarist Lucio Maia from Nação Zumbi and bassist and composer Antonio Pinto would be released  in North America, Japan, Australia and New Zealand on July 27 and in Europe on September 14. The album has been described as "how powerful Brazilian soul music can be."

In 2011, he collaborated with Beck on the Mario C. remix of "Tropicália" for the Red Hot Organization's most recent charitable album "Red Hot+Rio 2."

In 2012, he collaborated with American fashion designer Rachel Roy on a line of sportswear, footwear, jewelry and handbags.

In 2015, he was nominated for the 16th Latin Grammy Awards in the Best Brazilian Contemporary Pop Album category.

On September 8, he performed after lighting the cauldron in the 2016 Summer Paralympics opening ceremony in Rio de Janeiro.

According to a DNA test, Seu Jorge is 85.1% African, 12.9% European and 2% Amerindian. He belongs to haplogroup R1b, suggesting that his paternal lineage probably derives from Western Europe.

Solo discography
 Samba Esporte Fino (2001)
 Cru (2005)
 The Life Aquatic Studio Sessions (2005)
 América Brasil O Disco (2007)
 Seu Jorge & Almaz (2010)
 Músicas para Churrasco, Vol. 1 (2011)
 Músicas para Churrasco, Vol. 2 (2015)

Filmography
City of God (2002) as Mané Galinha - Knockout Ned
Moro no Brasil (2002) as Himself
The Life Aquatic with Steve Zissou (2004) as Pelé dos Santos
House of Sand (2005) as Massu - 1910-1919
Elipsis (2006) as Coyote
Sleepwalkers (2007)
The Escapist (2008) as Viv Batista
Carmo (2008) as Amparo de Jesús
The Elite Squad 2 (2010) as Beirada
Anderson Silva: Like Water (2011, Documentary) as Himself
Reis e Ratos (2012) as Américo Vilarinho
E Aí... Comeu? (2012) as Seu Jorge, o Garçom
City of God - 10 Years Later (2012)
Pelé: Birth of a Legend (2016) as Dondinho
Soundtrack (2017) as Cao
Paraíso Perdido (2018) as Teylor
Abe (2019) as Chico
Marighella (2019) as Carlos Marighella
Brotherhood (2019, TV Series) as Edison
Pixinguinha, Um Homem Carinhoso (2021) as Pixinguinha
Medida Provisória (2022) as Andre

DVDs
 MTV Apresenta Seu Jorge (2004)
 Ana & Jorge: Ao Vivo with Ana Carolina (2005)
 Seu Jorge – Live at Montreux (2006)
 América Brasil Ao Vivo (2009)
 Músicas para churrasco ao vivo (2012)

References

External links
 – official site
 – official site

1970 births
Living people
Afro-Brazilian composers
Brazilian male film actors
Brazilian emigrants to the United States
Afro-Brazilian male singers
Brazilian singer-songwriters
Brazilian soul singers
Hollywood Records artists
People from Bedford Roxo
Música Popular Brasileira singers
Latin Grammy Award winners
Brazilian people of indigenous peoples descent
Afro-Brazilian male actors
Because Music artists
Afro-Brazilian male songer-songwriters
Now-Again Records artists
Latin music songwriters
IFFI Best Actor (Male) winners